Viasat Kino is a movie television channel targeting the Baltic countries, Russia, Kazakhstan and other Eastern European countries. It is owned by the international broadcaster Viasat World and was launched in 2003 by Swedish media conglomerate Modern Times Group.  TV1000 East was rebranded in December 2009.

In March 1, 2023, TV1000 East renamed to Viasat Kino. It happened when Russia changed its seal to Viju and it called Viju TV1000.

External links 
 Official site
 VIASAT World
 Modern Times Group

References

Modern Times Group
Television channels in Russia
Television stations in Denmark
Television channels in North Macedonia
Television channels and stations established in 2004